Jawun (formerly named Indigenous Enterprise Partnerships) is an Australian, non-profit organisation which manages secondments from the corporate and public sectors to a range of Aboriginal and Torres Strait Islander partner organisations in urban, regional and remote communities across Australia.

Name
Jawun means 'family or friend' in the Kuku Yalanji language of Cape York, Queensland.

Operating model
Under the Jawun operating model, Indigenous partners determine their development priorities. Working with Jawun, these partners identify projects and areas for secondee support, then Jawun engages corporate and government secondees who apply their skills to assist Indigenous partners in achieving their development goals, while simultaneously gaining an opportunity for personal and professional growth. Generally, secondments are five to six weeks in length.

History
Jawun was established in 2001 when the Boston Consulting Group and Westpac seconded several executives to work with Indigenous Australian leaders in communities in Cape York. The model for Jawun was based on concepts in Noel Pearson's 2000 book Our Right To Take Responsibility.

Since 2001, Jawun has expanded to include a total of 12 regions across Australia; Cape York, Goulburn Murray, East Kimberley, Inner Sydney, Central Coast, West Kimberley, Central Australia (NPY lands), North East Arnhem Land, Far West Coast of South Australia, Lower River Murray, South West Australia, and the Pilbara.

Jawun now partners with over 70 Indigenous organisations, and 25 corporate/government organisations, with more than 3500 staff members from secondment partners having taken part in Jawun secondments with Indigenous Australian organisations.

The Australian Public Service commenced participation in Jawun in 2012. Staff from agencies including the Defence Materiel Organisation, and the Australian Taxation Office, have participated since that time. In 2015, an Australian Public Service Commission evaluation found participation in Jawun was delivering significant professional development for public service staff.

Jawun celebrated its 15th anniversary at a celebration dinner in Canberra on 16 June 2015.

A KPMG review of Jawun, delivered in April 2016, found that Jawun had brought benefits both to communities and to their corporate and government partners. The review was funded by the Australian Government and the Commonwealth Bank.

References

Non-profit organisations based in New South Wales
Organizations established in 2001
Organisations serving Indigenous Australians